The Slovakia men's national inline hockey team is the national team for the Slovakia. Most recently, the team won the silver medal at the 2008 Men's World Inline Hockey Championships.

World Championship results by year
2004 – 5th place
2005 – 
2006 – 6th place
2007 – 8th place
2008 – Silver Medal
2009 – 8th place
2010 – 8th place
2011 – 8th place
2012 – Gold Medal – Division I
2013 – 4th place
2014 – 7th place
2015 – 4th place
2017 –

References
http://stats.iihf.com/hydra/inline/157/IHM1570SVK_33_1_0.pdf

External links
IIHF Slovakia
Website

Inline hockey in Slovakia
National inline hockey teams
Inline hockey
Men's sport in Slovakia